This is a list of notable Malaysian actors.

List

A
 Zahiril Adzim 
 Fattah Amin
 David Arumugam
 Awal Ashaari
 Aedy Ashraf
 Aaron Aziz

B
 Ning Baizura

C
 Amber Chia

D
 Iqram Dinzly

E
 Faezah Elai

F
 Erra Fazira

G
 'Punnagai Poo' Gheetha

H
 Chen Hanwei

I
 Sarimah Ibrahim
 Hans Isaac
 Remy Ishak
 Izzue Islam

J
 Ayda Jebat
 Tang Jun-sang

K
 Kamahl
 Farid Kamil
 Sangeeta Krishnasamy
 Beto Kusyairy
 Syafiq Kyle

L
 Angelica Lee
 James Lee
 Mandy Lieu

M
 Rani Moorthy

N
 Ash Nair
 Pushpa Narayan

O
 Aziz M. Osman

P
 Francissca Peter

R
 Ramya Raj
 P. Ramlee
 Zizan Razak 
 Aisha Retno

S
 Sarimah
 Alif Satar
 Guy Sebastian
 Nelydia Senrose
 Jins Shamsuddin
 Haanii Shivraj
 Kavita Sidhu
 Huzir Sulaiman

T
 Nicholas Teo
 Nadine Ann Thomas

V
 Chacko Vadaketh
 Malaysia Vasudevan
 Jaclyn Victor
 Adrian Voo

W
 Bala Ganapathi William

Y
 Michelle Yeoh
 Syafiq Yusof 
 Syamsul Yusof

Z
 Zaiton
 You Zhangjing
 Julia Ziegler 

Malaysia